Templeman may refer to:

 Templeman (surname)
 Templeman, Newfoundland and Labrador, Canada
 Templeman, Virginia, United States